Shogo Suzuki or Shōgo Suzuki may refer to:

, Japanese actor, voice actor and narrator
, Japanese actor and musician